Allan Pollock (c. 1878 – January 18, 1942) was an English actor.  In the United States, he was known for stage appearances in Hawthorne of the U.S.A. (1912) and A Bill of Divorcement (1921).  He joined the British armed forces in World War I in 1914, two days after war was declared, and rose to the rank of captain.  In 1916 he was seriously wounded in the Ypres Salient and recovered in hospitals for more than three years and had eleven operations.

References

External links

1870s births
1942 deaths
English male stage actors
20th-century English male actors
British Army personnel of World War I
British Army officers
British expatriate male actors in the United States